Paleomycology is the study of fossil fungi. A paleomycologist is someone who works in this field. Paleomycology is considered a subdiscipline of paleobotany. While most fossils of mushrooms are discovered in amber, a great diversity of fossil fungi have been documented throughout the Phanerozoic.

See also
Evolution of fungi
Mycology
Paleontology

References

Prehistoric fungi
Mycology
Mycology